Nina P. Nayak (born 24 November 1953) is a social worker and child rights activist from Dakshina Kannada. She has dedicated her life to the promotion and protection of child rights.

She gave a presentation on the role of children in governance in a TEDx event in Bangalore on 6 April 2012. She has authored several articles and books. Nayak was a former chairperson for Karnataka State Commission for Protection of Child Rights. Previously, she was also the vice-president of the Indian Council for Child Welfare and member of the sub-committee on children in the National Planning Commission of India.

Education
Nina Nayak has a Master's degree in social work with specialization in family and child welfare, and a Bachelor's degree in home science from University of Madras, with core subjects child development, food and nutrition. She has a certificate in human rights from Indira Gandhi National Open University (IGNOU).

Career
As a child rights activist for the last 30 years she has held several positions of responsibility

 Chairperson, Child Welfare Committee, Bangalore
 Chairperson, Karnataka State Commission for Protection of Child Rights for three terms.
 Vice-president of the Indian Council for Child Welfare.
 Member of the National Commission for Protection of Child Rights (equivalent to Secretary to Government of India)
 Member of the Sub-Committee on children for the 11th five-year Plan, National Planning Commission of India.
Successfully defended Mohammad Afroz- One of the accused in Nirbhaya Rape and Murder Case on the grounds that he is a Minor.

Politics
On 10 March 2014 she was Aam Aadmi Party candidate for Bangalore South Lok Sabha constituency and received 21403 votes (1.9% of the total votes polled) and lost to Ananth Kumar of BJP

Personal life
Nina Nayak has brought up 2 adopted children.

External links
 Nina Nayak at TEDx

References

1953 births
Living people
Indian women activists
Aam Aadmi Party candidates in the 2014 Indian general election
Politicians from Bangalore
University of Madras alumni
Social workers
Aam Aadmi Party politicians
Women in Karnataka politics
People from Dakshina Kannada district
Activists from Karnataka
Indian children's rights activists
20th-century Indian educators
20th-century Indian educational theorists
Indian nutritionists
Women scientists from Karnataka
21st-century Indian women politicians
21st-century Indian politicians
Women educators from Karnataka
Educators from Karnataka
Social workers from Karnataka
20th-century women educators
20th-century Indian women